The Hague Secret Emissary Affair (Heigeu teuksa sageon, 헤이그 특사사건) resulted from Emperor Gojong of the Korean Empire sending confidential emissaries to the Second Peace Conference at The Hague, the Netherlands, in 1907.

Background
Following Japan's victory over Russia in the Russo-Japanese War (1904–05), Japan sought to formalize its control over the Korean Peninsula. Japan assumed hegemony over the Empire of Korea with the Eulsa Treaty of 1905.

Event
Emperor Gojong sent three secret emissaries, Yi Tjoune, Yi Sang-seol and Yi Wi-jong to the Second Hague Peace Convention to declare the invalidity of Japanese diplomatic maneuvers, including the Japan–Korea Treaty of 1905 (Eulsa Treaty).  Gojong's representatives asserted the monarch's rights to rule Korea independent of Japan. However, the nations at The Hague did not allow the emissaries to take part in the conference and blocked this diplomatic mission.

Because of Russia's opposition to Japan, Nicholas II of Russia tried to help the three Korean emissaries to enter the convention hall, though these efforts were ultimately blocked by Japan. Emperor Gojong's emissaries were unable to gain entry into the convention hall. Korea was no longer viewed as an independent nation by the nations, as Japan had assumed responsibility for its international representation.

In Korea 
In Korea, Gojong of Korea was threatened his throne by Pro-Japanese cabinet formed by Itō Hirobumi. Song Byeong-jun, the Agriculture, and Industry Minister requested Gojong to visit Japan and apologize to Emperor Meiji or capitulate to Hasegawa Yoshimichi, the commander of Korean Residence Japanese Army.

Rescission
In 1965, the treaties of Japan were confirmed to be "already null and void" by the Treaty on Basic Relations between Japan and the Republic of Korea.

 when the government of the Republic of Korea was established; but the Korean analysis of the 1965 declaration construes it as acknowledging the nullification of all treaties and agreements from 1904 onwards, which is consistent with the argument Yi Tjoune and others attempted to articulate in the Netherlands in 1907.

See also
 Taft–Katsura Agreement
 Japan–Korea Treaty of 1905
 Japan–Korea Treaty of 1907
 Japan–Korea Treaty of 1910

Notes

References
Eckert, Carter J., Ki-baik Lee, Young Ick Lew, Michael Robinson, and Edward W. Wagner. (1990). Korea Old and New: A History. Cambridge: Harvard University Press. ;  OCLC 23071907
 Korean Mission to the Conference on the Limitation of Armament, Washington, D.C., 1921-1922. (1922). Korea's Appeal to the Conference on Limitation of Armament. Washington: U.S. Government Printing Office. OCLC 12923609

 United States. Dept. of State. (1919). Catalogue of treaties: 1814-1918. Washington: Government Printing Office. OCLC  3830508
 Scott, James Brown. (1921). Korea, Treaties and Agreements. Washington, D.C.: Carnegie Endowment for International Peace.  OCLC 459192091

1907 in Korea
History of Korea
Japan–Korea relations
Korean Empire
Hague Conventions of 1899 and 1907